South Macon Township is located in Macon County, Illinois. As of the 2010 census, its population was 1,457 and it contained 639 housing units. The city of Macon, Illinois is located in South Macon Township

Cities and towns 
 Macon
 Walker

Adjacent townships 
 South Wheatland Township (north)
 Mount Zion Township (northeast and east)
 Milam Township (east)
 Penn Township, Shelby County (southeast)
 Moweaqua Township, Shelby County (south)
 Prairieton Township, Christian County (southwest)
 Pleasant View Township (west)
 Blue Mound Township (northwest)

Geography

Demographics

References

External links
US Census
City-data.com
Illinois State Archives

Townships in Macon County, Illinois
Townships in Illinois